Is Everyone Hanging Out Without Me? (And Other Concerns) is a 2011 memoir by writer and actress Mindy Kaling. The book was on the New York Times Bestsellers list for 5 weeks.

Background
In 2010 Crown Publishing Group announced that it acquired a book from Kaling, and described it as a cross between the Nora Ephron play Love, Loss and What I Wore and Kaling's blog "Things I've Bought That I Love." The book was originally titled The Contents of My Purse.

Synopsis
Kaling tells stories from her life and details her observations about love, friendship, Hollywood, dieting, her relationship with her mother, among other things.

Reception
Jen Chaney of The Washington Post called the book "a breezy, intermittently amusing and somewhat unfocused first essay collection."

References

Show business memoirs
2011 non-fiction books
Comedy books
Books by Mindy Kaling
Crown Publishing Group books